Shadhora tehsil is a fourth-order administrative and revenue division, a subdivision of third-order administrative and revenue division of Ashoknagar district of Madhya Pradesh.

Geography
Shadhora tehsil is bounded by Guna district in the southwest, west, northwest and north, Isagarh tehsil in the northeast and east, Ashoknagar tehsil  in the southeast and south.

See also 
Ashoknagar district

Citations

External links

Tehsils of Madhya Pradesh
Ashoknagar district